Kamienna may refer to the following places in Poland:
Kamienna, Lower Silesian Voivodeship (south-west Poland)
Kamienna, Kuyavian-Pomeranian Voivodeship (north-central Poland)
Kamienna, Kutno County in Łódź Voivodeship (central Poland)
Kamienna, Piotrków County in Łódź Voivodeship (central Poland)
Kamienna, Świętokrzyskie Voivodeship (south-central Poland)
Kamienna, Lubusz Voivodeship (west Poland)
Kamienna, Opole Voivodeship (south-west Poland)
Kamienna, Pomeranian Voivodeship (north Poland)
Kamienna, West Pomeranian Voivodeship (north-west Poland)